This is a listing of official releases by American singer and actress Della Reese.

Albums

Studio albums

Live albums

Collaboration albums

Compilation albums

Charting singles

Videography
 An Evening with Tito Puente and Della Reese

Cash box links
And That Reminds Me 
Don't You Know
And Now
Someday (You'll Want Me to Want You)
The Most Beautiful Words
After Loving You

References

External links
 
 

Discographies of American artists
Rhythm and blues discographies